The Lange-Taylor Prize (or Dorothea Lange–Paul Taylor Prize) is a prize awarded annually since 1990 by the Center for Documentary Studies at Duke University, Durham, NC, to encourage collaboration between documentary writers and photographers. The prize, that has variously been $10,000 and $20,000 (USD), is named after photographer Dorothea Lange and her husband, writer Paul Schuster Taylor. It has been awarded since 1990.

Winners
1991: Keith Carter
1992: Gray Brechin and Robert Dawson
1993: Donna DeCesare and Luis J. Rodriguez for Mara Salvatrucha – An exploration of the lives of the young men and women in Salvadoran street gangs. 
1994: 
1995: 
1996: Mary Berridge and River Huston for Women – Visual and verbal portraits of HIV-positive women and their families.
1997: Ernesto Bazan and Silvana Paternostro for El Periodo Especial – Life in Cuba since the collapse of the Soviet Union.
1998: Rob Amberg and Sam Gray for I-26: Corridor of Change – the physical, economic, and social changes accompanying highway construction in remote Appalachia.
1999: Jason Eskenazi and Jennifer Gould Keil for Mountain Jews: A Lost Tribe – the transition of a centuries-old village in the Caucasus from its traditional way of life. 
2000: 
2001: 
2002: 
2003: Misty Keasler and Charles D'Ambrosio.
2004: Katherine Dunn and Jim Lommasson.
2005: Kent Haruf and Peter Brown.
2006: Donald Weber and Larry Frolick.
2007: Kurt Pitzer and Roger LeMoyne.
2008: Ilan Greenberg and Carolyn Drake for Becoming Chinese: Uighurs in Cultural Transition.
2009: Teru Kuwayama and Christian Parenti.
2010: Tiana Markova-Gold and Sarah Dohrmann.
2013: Jen Kinney.
2014: Jon Lowenstein.
2015: Michel Huneault Post Mégantic
2016: Steven M. Cozart for The Pass/Fail Series
2017: Katherine Yungmee Kim for Severence
2018: Daniel Ramos for The Land of Illustrious Men
2019: Chinen Aimi for Finding Ryukyu

References

External links

Awards established in 2003
Photography awards
American non-fiction literary awards